The Tour du Pays de Vaud is a junior (ages 17-18) multi-day cycling race held annually in Switzerland. It has been part of the UCI Junior Nations' Cup since 2015.

Winners

References

External links

Cycle races in Switzerland
Recurring sporting events established in 1967
1967 establishments in Switzerland